Isabel Olid Báez (born 4 October 1977), known as Bel Olid, is a Catalan writer, translator, and teacher of language, literature, translation, and creative writing. She has received several literary prizes, among them the 2010 . Since March 2015 she has been the president of the Associació d'Escriptors en Llengua Catalana. As of 2023, she is an Assistant Instructional Professor in Catalan and Spanish at the University of Chicago.

Biography
Born in Mataró, the daughter of immigrants from another region of Spain, Bel Olid earned a licentiate in Translation and Interpreting from the Autonomous University of Barcelona (UAB) in 1999, and has since dedicated herself to the translation of books and films. She has worked as a language and literature teacher since 2005. In 2010 she obtained a master's degree in Language and Literature Didactics. She has translated works into Catalan from English, German, French, Italian, and Spanish. She is a member of the Gretel children's and youth literature research group at the UAB.

In 2008 she published the storybook Estela, grita muy fuerte to help prevent child abuse, released by the Fineo publishing house for the Rana Association (Help Network for Abused Children) of the Balearic Islands. It received the QWERTY Award for best children's book.

In 2010 she published the essay Les heroïnes contraataquen: models literaris contra l'universal masculí, which received the Rovelló Award.

In 2011, Olid published her first novel, Una terra solitària, in which she portrays Andalusian immigration in Catalonia together with cultural, social, and sexual identity in the background, and in which she also introduces the problem of sexual abuse. In 2012 she published La mala reputació (Bad Reputation), awarded with the 2013 Roc Boronat de Narrativa.

In October 2014, together with the writers Josep Maria Espinàs and Albert Sánchez Piñol, she presented the Writers' Manifesto for Independence, signed by more than 300 writers in favor of the independence of Catalonia.

For the Catalan autonomous elections of 21 December 2017, Bel Olid participated in the lists of the leftist independence coalition Popular Unity Candidacy (CUP) for Barcelona.

Works

Books
 ¡Estela, grita muy fuerte! (2008), Editorial Fineo, 
 Les Heroïnes contraataquen (2011), 
 Una terra solitària (2011), 
 La mala reputació (2012), 
 Vents més salvatges (2016), Planeta Group, 
 Vides aturades (2016), Ara Llibres, 
 Feminisme de butxaca (2017), 
 Garbancito (2018), Combel Edit, 
 Follem? (2019), Bridge,

Translations

German to Catalan

Literary awards
 2010:  for Una terra solitària
 2011: Rovelló Award for Les heroïnes contraataquen: models literaris contra l'universal masculí
 2012: Roc Boronat Award for Celobert amb papallones (La mala reputació)

References

External links

 Official blog
 

1977 births
21st-century Spanish educators
21st-century Spanish novelists
21st-century Spanish women writers
21st-century translators
Spanish educators
Autonomous University of Barcelona alumni
Novelists from Catalonia
Politicians from Catalonia
Short story writers from Catalonia
Writers from Catalonia
Non-binary writers
Translators from Catalonia
Catalan–Spanish translators
English–Catalan translators
English–Spanish translators
French–Catalan translators
French–Spanish translators
German–Catalan translators
Italian–Catalan translators
Italian–Spanish translators
Living people
People from Mataró
21st-century educators